Deloris were a 4 (sometimes 5) piece indie rock band from Melbourne, Australia, who were active from 1999 until 2008.

History
Deloris was formed in Frankston, Victoria, by Marcus Teague (singer/songwriter), Simon Heelis (guitar), Luke Turley (drums) and Stuart Charles (bass) in the 1990s. The band recorded a four-song demo tape in 1994 at Sandringham Studios, and another four songs at Backbeach Studios in Rye in 1996. On the back of these demos the band began playing around Melbourne and garnering local reviews. The trio would return to Back Beach in 1998 to record enough songs to form an album and the resulting LP 'Fraulein' was released on Perth label Halflight Records.

In 1999 the band flew to Perth and spent two weeks recording and mixing their second album, The Pointless Gift, which was released by Sydney label Quietly Suburban Records in December 2000 and received a glowing critical response, with Melbourne's The Age newspaper giving it four stars, saying "a huge future awaits Deloris". Leigh Lambert joined the band as a second guitarist and Deloris would tour Australia with the likes of Augie March, Something For Kate, Art of Fighting and Purplene as well as play support to internationals The Mountain Goats and Delgados. During this time the band released a split seven-inch vinyl single with Braving The Seabed, and UK label Scientific Laboratories released The Pointless Gift in the UK. Deloris also recorded a live set for Triple J radio's 'Oz Music Show'.

In 2001 Luke Turley left the band and after a brief stint with Something for Kate drummer Clint Hyndman filling in on drums, a replacement was found in Daniel Brimelow. In 2002 Deloris began work on their third record 'Fake Our Deaths', soliciting the services of engineer Matt Voigt (Cat Power, The Nation Blue, Augie March, The Dirty Three) and assistant engineer Hugh Counsell (later worked with Race the Fray), to commence recording at Melbourne's Sing Sing studios. The self-funded band struggled through the long recording process, recording only when money and time would allow.

The resulting thirteen-track album Fake Our Deaths was completed in late 2003, only months before Quietly Suburban ceased to operate. Without a label, the band printed up an EP featuring album tracks 'The Unbroke Part Of It' and 'Playing the Spaces' both of which were picked up by radio station Triple J and were added to high rotation on their playlist. The band was signed by the newly formed Dot Dash records (an offshoot of Remote Control records) in mid-2004, and 'Fake Our Deaths' was released late that year, alongside a growing roster of artists that included New Buffalo and Wolf & Cub. Throughout the remainder of 2004 and during 2005, the band toured Australia several times.

Lambert and Heelis both left the band at the end of the 'Fake Our Deaths' touring cycle, leaving Teague and Brimelow to work on new music. In 2005 the duo entered Abercorn studios in Harkaway, Victoria, to begin work on what would become 'Ten Lives'. After recording basic tracks for around half the album, Brimelow left the band to focus on family. Teague, the sole remaining band member, would go on to write and record all instruments for the album, drafting in friend Ben Gook for several bass tracks and Turley once again to record additional drum tracks. 'Ten Lives' was released in 2006 by Dot Dash records, and throughout that year and the next, Deloris would headline tour Australia (as well as support Okkervil River nationally) with a revolving cast of musicians that included Ben Gook (bass), Anthony Petrucci (guitar), Hugh Counsell (guitar), Dan Brimelow (drums), Luke Turley (drums), Tim O'Connor (guitar) Joe Hammond (drums) and Ben Keenan (guitar). In late 2007 the lineup of Teague, Hammond, Gook and guest guitarist Petrucci solidified, and the quartet were selected as the main support on Something For Kate's national tour. In early 2008 this lineup played their last high profile show as guests of Brooklyn band The National.

After just a handful of local shows in 2008, the band privately considered Deloris finished. In 2009 Teague, Hammond and Gook set about writing for a new project, drafting in guitarist Tim O'Connor. Teague also completed his debut Single Twin record and in February 2010, though not having played a show in over a year, an official statement was posted on the Deloris MySpace page signifying the end of Deloris.

Teague's Single Twin debut LP 'Marcus Teague' was released in June 2011.

Discography
Ten Lives (Dot Dash/Remote Control Records – 2006)
Feather Figure/Elastic Bones (acoustic EP) + Video (Dot Dash/Independent – 2005)
Fake Our Deaths (Dot Dash – 2004)
Dead Drunks ltd edition EP (Remote Control Records/independent – 2004)
Playing The Spaces EP (independent – 2003)
Deloris/Braving the Seabed (Split 7 inch — Steady Cam Records – 2002)
The Pointless Gift (Quietly Suburban Records / MGM – 2001)
Fraulein (Halflight Records / MGM – 1998)

References

External links
Official site
Deloris page
Single Twin

Australian indie rock groups
Musical groups from Melbourne
People from Frankston, Victoria
21st-century Australian musicians